Jason Nicholas Burnett (born December 16, 1986) is a Canadian trampoline gymnast from Etobicoke, Ontario. He is noted for having completed, in training, the world's most difficult trampoline routine with a degree of difficulty of 20.6 and holding the world record of 18.8 for a routine performed in a competition. He has placed first in the Canadian National Championships eight times in individual trampoline. In the 2008 Olympic Games he won a silver medal.

Career

On June 12, 2010, at the Davos Trampoline World Cup he completed a routine with a degree of difficulty (DD or tariff) of 18.80 breaking his own world record of 18.0. He finished in 2nd place in the competition. He also holds the world record for a synchronised trampoline routine with his partner, Philip Barbaro, with a DD of 16.0. However, as their marks for synchronisation and execution were very low, they only came in 7th place in the competition in Quebec City in 2007.

He has won the Canadian Senior Men's Trampoline Championship eight times, most recently in Ottawa in 2014.

He currently trains at Skyriders Trampoline Place in Richmond Hill alongside Karen Cockburn and Rosannagh MacLennan with trainer Dave Ross.

In the preliminary round of the 2008 Summer Olympics in Beijing, Burnett finished in seventh place and qualified for the finals of the trampoline event after a very strong optional routine. In the finals, he won the silver medal in the event with the most difficult routine of the competition.

Before Burnett broke his fibula in 2010, he won 1st place for Men's Individual Trampoline at the Elite Canada competition in Airdrie, Alberta. At the Pacific Rim Championships, Burnett won 1st place in both Men's Individual Trampoline and Men's Synchronized Trampoline along with his partner, Charles Thibault. Moreover, Burnett took home 1st again at the Canadian Championships in Kamloops, British Columbia.

In 2011, Burnett won 1st place for Individual Trampoline at the Canada Cup in Airdrie, Alberta with a 17.8 DD. At the same competition, he also took home 2nd place for Synchronized Trampoline (again, with Charles Thibault as his partner).

In January 2012, at the 2012 Gymnastics Olympic Test Event, Burnett finished in 4th place which qualified Canada for a place in the Men's Trampoline event at the 2012 Summer Olympics in London. He was later selected as the Olympic competitor following a series of qualifying competitions. At the Olympic Games he finished in 8th place, although  doping procedures relating to numerous athletes are still underway. Therefore, results are not final.

In May 2014, Burnett won the Men's title in the Canadian National Championship in Ottawa. Later in 2014, he injured his leg and had to have surgery to repair knee ligaments. He managed to come back and win his 9th Canadian Individual Trampoline Championship in July 2015. In the Pan Am Games in Toronto, he came 4th.

Honours
In 2012 Burnett was awarded the Queen Elizabeth II Diamond Jubilee Medal.

References

1986 births
Living people
Canadian male trampolinists
Olympic gymnasts of Canada
Olympic silver medalists for Canada
Olympic medalists in gymnastics
Medalists at the 2008 Summer Olympics
Gymnasts at the 2008 Summer Olympics
Gymnasts at the 2012 Summer Olympics
Gymnasts at the 2016 Summer Olympics
Pan American Games gold medalists for Canada
Pan American Games medalists in gymnastics
Gymnasts at the 2007 Pan American Games
Gymnasts at the 2015 Pan American Games
King City Secondary School alumni
Gymnasts from Toronto
Medalists at the 2007 Pan American Games
20th-century Canadian people
21st-century Canadian people